Hōjō Tokiyori (June 29, 1227 – December 24, 1263) was the fifth shikken (regent) of the Kamakura shogunate in Japan.

Early life
He was born to warrior monk Hōjō Tokiuji and a daughter of Adachi Kagemori.

Rule
Tokiyori became shikken following his brother Tsunetoki's death. Immediately after the succession, he crushed a coup plot by former shōgun Kujō Yoritsune and Tokiyori's relative Nagoe Mitsutoki. In the next year, he let Adachi Kagemori destroy the powerful Miura clan in the Battle of Hochi. He recalled his experienced grandfather's brother, Hōjō Shigetoki, from Kyoto and appointed him as rensho. In 1252, he replaced Shogun Kujō Yoritsugu with Prince Munetaka, and so successfully solidified the power base.

Reforms
Tokiyori has been praised for his good administration. He worked on reforms mainly by writing various regulations. He reduced service of the vassals to guard Kyoto. He worked toward resolving the increasing land disputes of his vassals. In 1249, he set up the legal system of Hikitsuke or High Court.

Personal life and dictatorship
In 1252, he started to make policies at private meetings held at his residence instead of discussing at the Hyōjō, the council of the shogunate. In 1256, when he became a Buddhist priest, he transferred the position of shikken to Hōjō Nagatoki, a son of Shigetoki, while his infant son with women named Akiko, Tokimune, succeeded to become tokusō, the head of the Hōjō clan and his son with Tsubone Sanuki, Hōjō Tokisuke succeeded as the head of rokuhara. thus separating the positions for the first time. He continued to rule in fact but without any official position. This is considered the beginning of the tokusō dictatorship.

Legends
There are a number of legends that Tokiyori traveled incognito throughout Japan to inspect actual conditions and improve the lives of the people.

Death
Tokiyori died in 1263 at the age of 36.

External links

1227 births
1263 deaths
Adachi clan
Tokiyori
Regents of Japan
People of Kamakura-period Japan